Marianne Boesky Gallery is an art gallery located in the New York City neighborhood of Chelsea and in Aspen, Colorado. Founded in 1996 in Soho by Marianne Boesky, it specializes in contemporary art. It represents established artists like Frank Stella and Jennifer Bartlett and a younger generation of artists like Sanford Biggers, The Haas Brothers, and Jammie Holmes. The gallery has two exhibition spaces in New York City and one in Aspen.

History
Marianne Boesky founded her eponymous gallery in Soho in 1996. Marianne Boesky developed her program by representing and introducing the art world to Lisa Yuskavage, Takashi Murakami, and Yoshitomo Nara.

In 2014, Marianne Boesky expanded to the Lower East Side although this space was later closed in 2016 in order to expand the Chelsea location. In 2017, Boesky opened a location in Aspen, Colorado designed by the architect Annabelle Selldorf.

Artists

 Ghada Amer
 Jennifer Bartlett
 Gina Beavers
 Sanford Biggers
 Bjorn Braun
 Pier Paolo Calzolari
 Julia Dault
 Sue de Beer
 Svenja Deininger
 Barnaby Furnas
 The Haas Brothers
 Allison Janae Hamilton
 Jay Heikes
 John Houck

 Jessica Jackson Hutchins
 Maria Lai
 Dashiell Manley
 Sarah Meyohas (since 2022)
 Donald Moffett
 Serge Alain Nitegeka
 William J. O'Brien
 Hans Op de Beeck
 Anthony Pearson
 Thiago Rocha Pitta
 Salvatore Scarpitta
 Frank Stella
 Hannah Van Bart
 John Waters
 Claudia Wieser

References

External links
 

Contemporary art galleries in the United States
Art museums and galleries in New York City
Art museums and galleries in Manhattan
Art galleries established in 1996
1996 establishments in New York City
Art museums and galleries in Colorado
2017 establishments in Colorado
Tourist attractions in Aspen, Colorado